Fernando Albino de Sousa Chalana (10 February 1959 – 10 August 2022) was a Portuguese football player and manager.

Widely regarded as one of the greatest talents of his era in Portuguese football, the diminutive left winger's main asset was his ball control and dribbling skills.

His career, highly troubled by injuries, was mainly spent at Benfica, where he also later worked as a manager. Prior to his physical problems, he helped Portugal reach the semi-finals at Euro 1984.

Playing career
Born in Barreiro, Setúbal District, Chalana began his football career at F.C. Barreirense, then moved to Lisbon neighbours S.L. Benfica in 1974, where he established himself the following eight years, scoring and assisting alike as he helped them conquer, amongst other accolades, five Primeira Liga and three Taça de Portugal trophies.

Aged only 17 (fourth youngest ever), on 17 November 1976, Chalana won his first cap for Portugal, against Denmark for the 1978 FIFA World Cup qualifiers – at that age, he became Benfica's youngest player to score a goal at the Estádio da Luz. The peak of his career took place precisely on the international front, at UEFA Euro 1984, in France. There, the Little Genius was one of the team's leading figures, excelling in dribbling throughout the tournament, notably in the 3–2 semi-final loss against the hosts, setting up both goals for Rui Jordão.

Moving to a club in that country after the tournament, FC Girondins de Bordeaux, Chalana failed to impress over three full seasons, mainly due to persistent injuries. In 1987 he returned to Benfica, never being able to reproduce his previous form; his last international appearance was a friendly with Sweden on 12 November 1988, which finished with a goalless draw.

Chalana wrapped his career at 33, with one season apiece with Lisbon-based sides C.F. Os Belenenses and C.F. Estrela da Amadora, the latter in the second division.

Coaching career
In 1999–2000, Chalana was at the helm of Benfica's juniors, winning the national championship. He had his first senior coaching experience four years later, assisting at modest F.C. Paços de Ferreira in a top-flight relegation as 17th.

The following years, Chalana served as assistant to several managers at Benfica. However, in March 2008 he replaced José Antonio Camacho after the Spaniard was dismissed. In 2002, he had already had a one-game spell as interim, filling in for the dismissed Jesualdo Ferreira – days before precisely Camacho arrived; in that match he placed winger Miguel as a right-back, where he ultimately gained worldwide recognition.

After one more season as assistant, now to Quique Sánchez Flores, Chalana returned to the junior side.

Personal life and death
Other than his main nickname, Chalana was also dubbed Chalanix (as his moustache resembled that of comic character Asterix).

He died on 10 August 2022 at the age of 63, due to degenerative disease.

Career statistics
Scores and results list Portugal's goal tally first, score column indicates score after each Chalana goal.

|}

Honours
Benfica
Primeira Divisão: 1975–76, 1976–77, 1980–81, 1982–83, 1983–84, 1988–89
Taça de Portugal: 1979–80, 1980–81, 1982–83
Supertaça Cândido de Oliveira: 1980, 1989
Taça de Honra (3)

Bordeaux
Ligue 1: 1984–85, 1986–87
Coupe de France: 1985–86, 1986–87
Trophée des champions: 1986

Individual
Portuguese Footballer of the Year: 1976, 1984
UEFA European Championship Team of the Tournament: 1984

References

Further reading

External links

1959 births
2022 deaths
Sportspeople from Barreiro, Portugal
Portuguese footballers
Association football wingers
Primeira Liga players
Liga Portugal 2 players
S.L. Benfica footballers
C.F. Os Belenenses players
C.F. Estrela da Amadora players
Ligue 1 players
FC Girondins de Bordeaux players
Portugal youth international footballers
Portugal under-21 international footballers
Portugal international footballers
UEFA Euro 1984 players
Portuguese expatriate footballers
Expatriate footballers in France
Portuguese expatriate sportspeople in France
Portuguese football managers
Primeira Liga managers
S.L. Benfica managers
S.L. Benfica non-playing staff